Carex cristatella is a species of sedge native to eastern North America. It is an introduced species in Europe. Carex cristatella is a common species in wetlands such as swamps, marshes, shorelines, and wet prairies.

References

cristatella
Plants described in 1896
Flora of North America